Wattston is a village on the B803, west of Greengairs in North Lanarkshire, Scotland. Between them Wattston and Greengairs have about 1,190 residents. It is around 4 km south of Cumbernauld, and 4 km north of Airdrie. Other places nearby include Caldercruix, Longriggend, Riggend and Slamannan.

There is still open cast mining in this former mining village. The village was badly affected by the Stanrigg Mining Disaster  where, in July 1918, a collapse led to the deaths of 19 local mine workers.

The 98th corps of the Lanarkshire Rifle Volunteers was headquartered at Wattston.

See also
List of places in North Lanarkshire
List of places in Scotland

References

External links

RCAHMS record of Wattston, New Monkland
CANMORE/RCAHMS record of Wattston, General
Geograph image of Stanrigg Memorial Park, Wattston

Villages in North Lanarkshire